Allosturmia is a genus of flies in the family Tachinidae. It contains only one species, Allosturmia turicai.

References

Further reading

External links

 
 

Tachinidae
Monotypic Diptera genera